Michał Golus (born 10 January 1996) is a swimmer from Poland who competes in Paralympic S8 and SM8 (individual medley) events. 
At the 2018 World Para Swimming European Championships in Dublin, he won the 50 and 100 meter freestyle titles in the S8 category.

Career history
Golus began swimming in 2012, and first raced international at the 2017 World Para Swimming Championships.

Golus came to international attention winning two titles at the 2018 European championships, along with the silver medal in the 100 meter butterfly at the same meet.

Personal life
Golus is a graduate in Computer Science from the University of Technology and Humanities in Radom, Poland.

References

1996 births
Living people
Polish male butterfly swimmers
Polish male freestyle swimmers
Polish male medley swimmers
Paralympic swimmers of Poland
S8-classified Paralympic swimmers
Medalists at the World Para Swimming Championships
Medalists at the World Para Swimming European Championships
People from Radom
Swimmers at the 2020 Summer Paralympics
21st-century Polish people